Robert C. "Emma" Patterson was a college football player and coach.

Vanderbilt University
He was a prominent center for Dan McGugin's Vanderbilt Commodores of Vanderbilt University from 1903 to 1905.

1904
Patterson played in McGugin's first year of 1904.

1905
He was selected All-Southern in 1905.

Coaching
He coached at the Georgia Military Academy, and in 1908 returned as an assistant to Vanderbilt.

References

American football centers
Vanderbilt Commodores football players
Vanderbilt Commodores football coaches
All-Southern college football players